The 2021–22 Idaho Vandals men's basketball team represented the University of Idaho in the Big Sky Conference during the 2021–22 NCAA Division I men's basketball season. Led by third-year head coach Zac Claus, the Vandals played their home games on campus at the new Idaho Central Credit Union Arena in Moscow, Idaho.

Previous season

The previous season had been intended to be the 46th and final season for basketball in the Kibbie Dome, configured as the "Cowan Spectrum" for basketball since February 2001. Due to the COVID-19 pandemic, the 2020 football season in the Big Sky was delayed until the spring of 2021.
and home basketball games were moved to Memorial Gymnasium, 

The Vandals finished the 2020–21 season with a 1–21 record (1–17 in Big Sky, last). In the conference tournament, they lost to Montana in the quarterfinals.

Roster

Schedule and results

|-
!colspan=12 style=| Exhibition

|-
!colspan=12 style=| Regular season

|-
!colspan=9 style=| Big Sky tournament

Sources

References

Idaho Vandals men's basketball seasons
Idaho
Idaho Vandals men's basketball
Idaho Vandals men's basketball